Tariq Ali (born 21 October 1943) is a Pakistani-British political activist, writer, journalist, historian, filmmaker, and public intellectual. He is a member of the editorial committee of the New Left Review and Sin Permiso, and contributes to The Guardian, CounterPunch, and the London Review of Books. He read Philosophy, Politics, and Economics at Exeter College, Oxford.

He is the author of many books, including Pakistan: Military Rule or People's Power (1970), Can Pakistan Survive? The Death of a State (1983), Clash of Fundamentalisms: Crusades, Jihads and Modernity (2002), Bush in Babylon (2003), Conversations with Edward Said (2005), Pirates of the Caribbean: Axis Of Hope (2006), A Banker for All Seasons (2007), The Duel (2008), The Obama Syndrome (2010), and The Extreme Centre: A Warning (2015).

Early life 
Ali was born and raised in Lahore, Punjab in British India (later part of Pakistan). He is the son of journalist Mazhar Ali Khan and activist  Tahira Mazhar Ali Khan. Ali's mother, Tahira, was the daughter of Sir Sikandar Hyat Khan, who led the Unionist Muslim League and was later Prime Minister of the Punjab from 1937 to 1942. Ali's father, Mazhar, had been "mobilising peasants in his family’s fiefdom" when he was invited to join the Pakistan Times by Mian Iftikharuddin, later becoming sympathetic to the Communist cause, although he never joined the party.

Ali's father and mother, who were cousins, eloped. His mother later said: "Mazhar left for the Middle East on military service. I was very pregnant by then. We didn't see each other for two years. Our son Tariq was born while Mazhar was away. By the time he returned, I had joined the Communist Party. I had given away my entire trousseau, including the family jewels, to the Party."

Emerging activism
Ali first became politically active in his teens, taking part in opposition to the military dictatorship of Pakistan. An uncle who worked in the Pakistani military intelligence warned his parents that Ali could not be protected. His parents therefore decided to get him out of Pakistan and sent him to England, where he studied Philosophy, Politics, and Economics at Exeter College, Oxford. At Oxford, he became a member of the Oxford University Humanist Group, where he discovered "that debates and discussions here were far more stimulating than those conducted within the careerist confines of the Labour Club". He was elected President of the Oxford Union in 1965. In 1967 Ali was one of 64 prominent figures, including the Beatles, who signed a petition calling for the legalisation of marijuana. Ali's tenure at the Union included a meeting with Malcolm X in December 1964 during which Malcolm X expressed deep consternation about his own risk of assassination.

Career

His public profile began to grow during the Vietnam War, when he engaged in debates against the war with such figures as Henry Kissinger and Michael Stewart. He testified at the Russell Tribunal over US involvement in Vietnam. As time passed, Ali became increasingly critical of American and Israeli foreign policies. He was also a vigorous opponent of American relations with Pakistan that tended to back military dictatorships over democracy. He was one of the marchers on the American embassy in London in 1968 in a demonstration against the Vietnam war.
 
Active in the New Left of the 1960s, he has long been associated with the New Left Review. Ali inserted himself into politics through his involvement with The Black Dwarf newspaper.  In 1968 he joined the International Marxist Group (IMG). He was recruited to the leadership of the IMG and became a member of the International Executive Committee of the (reunified) Fourth International. He also befriended influential figures such as Malcolm X, Stokely Carmichael, John Lennon and Yoko Ono.

In 1967, Ali was in Camiri, Bolivia, not far from where Che Guevara was captured, to observe the trial of Régis Debray. He was accused of being a Cuban revolutionary by authorities. Ali then said: "If you torture me the whole night and I can speak Spanish in the morning I'll be grateful to you for the rest of my life."

During this period he was an IMG candidate in Sheffield Attercliffe at the February 1974 general election and was co-author of Trotsky for Beginners, a cartoon book. In 1981, Ali quit the IMG and joined the Labour Party to support Tony Benn in his bid to become deputy leader of the Labour Party.

In 1990, he published the satire Redemption, on the inability of the Trotskyists to handle the downfall of the Eastern bloc. The book contains parodies of many well-known figures in the Trotskyist movement. In 1999 Ali strongly criticised NATO intervention in Bosnia and Herzegovina in the piece Springtime for NATO, and book "Masters of the Universe? NATO’s Balkan Crusade" in which he negated extent and nature of crimes committed by Serbian forces in Bosnia and Kosovo. He also defended denialist claims espoused by figures such as Diana Johnstone and Edward S. Herman.

His book, Clash of Fundamentalisms, aimed to put the events of the September 11 attacks in historical perspective. He followed that with Bush in Babylon, which criticised the 2003 invasion of Iraq by American president George W. Bush. The book uses poetry and critical essays in portraying the war in Iraq as a failure. Ali believes that the new Iraqi government will fail.

Ali has remained a critic of modern neoliberal economics and was present at the 2005 World Social Forum in Porto Alegre, Brazil, where he was one of 19 to sign the Porto Alegre Manifesto. He supports the model of the Bolivarian Revolution in Venezuela.

He has been described as "the alleged inspiration" for the Rolling Stones' song "Street Fighting Man", recorded in 1968. John Lennon's "Power to the People" was inspired by an interview Lennon gave to Ali.

Ali participated in the 2012 Sight & Sound critics' poll, where he listed his ten favourite films as follows: The Battle of Algiers, Charulata, Crimson Gold, The Discreet Charm of the Bourgeoisie, Entranced Earth, If...., Osaka Elegy, The Puppetmaster, Rashomon, and Tout Va Bien.

Ali has also written in favour of Scottish independence.

During the 2016 United Kingdom European Union membership referendum, Ali was sympathetic to a Leave vote on left-wing grounds, whilst simultaneously criticizing right-wing support for Brexit based on opposition to immigration.

In 2020, Ali was a member of the Belmarsh Tribunal organized by Progressive International, investigating and evaluating the war crimes committed by the United States government in the 21st century.

In November 2020, a British public inquiry into the work of undercover police officers was provided with evidence that Ali had been spied upon by at least 14 undercover police officers over a period of decades. The surveillance began in 1965 when he became president of the Oxford Union, and continued until at least 2003, when Ali was on the national committee of the Stop the War Coalition trying to prevent the invasion of Iraq. Ali said "It is incredible to think that after 35 years, in 2003, under the Tony Blair Labour government, that Special Branch were still engaging in the same anti-democratic activity as they had been at the outset".

Screenplay
Tariq Ali's The Leopard and The Fox, first written as a BBC screenplay in 1985, is about the last days of Zulfiqar Ali Bhutto. Never previously produced because of a censorship controversy, it was finally premiered in New York in October 2007, the day before former Pakistani Prime Minister Benazir Bhutto returned to her home country after eight years in exile.

In 2009, Ali with Mark Weisbrot wrote the screenplay to the Oliver Stone documentary South of the Border. This gave a favourable account of Hugo Chávez and other left-wing Latin American leaders. Interviewed in the documentary, Ali explained the role that Bolivian water privatisation and the 2000 Cochabamba protests played in eventually bringing Evo Morales to power.

Personal life
Ali currently lives in Camden, north London, with his partner Susan Watkins, editor of the New Left Review. He has three children: Natasha from a previous relationship, and Chengiz and Aisha with Watkins. He grew up in a secular family that was more culturally Muslim than religious, and describes himself as an atheist.

Works 

 The New Revolutionaries: A Handbook of the International Radical Left (editor), New York: William Morrow and Company, Inc., 1969. Library of Congress Catalog Card Number 79-79860
 Pakistan: Military Rule or People's Power (1970). 
 The Coming British Revolution (1971). 
 1968 and After: Inside the Revolution (1978). 
 Chile, Lessons of the Coup: Which Way to Workers Power (1978) .
 Trotsky for Beginners (1980). 
 Can Pakistan Survive?: The Death of a State (1983). ; (1991) 
 Who's Afraid of Margaret Thatcher? In Praise of Socialism (1984). 
 The Stalinist Legacy: Its Impact on 20th-Century World Politics (1984). 
 An Indian Dynasty: The Story of the Nehru-Gandhi Family (1985). 
 Street Fighting Years: An Autobiography of the Sixties (1987). 
 Revolution from Above: Soviet Union Now (1988). 
 Iranian Nights (1989). 
 Moscow Gold (1990). 
 Redemption (1990). 
 Shadows of the Pomegranate Tree (1992; 1st in the Islam Quintet). 
 Necklaces (1992)
 Ugly Rumours (1998). 
 1968: Marching in the Streets (1998). 
 Fear of Mirrors Arcadia Books (4 August 1998). ; University of Chicago Press (10 Aug 2010). 
 The Book of Saladin (1998; 2nd in the "Islam Quintet"). 
 Snogging Ken (2000). 
 The Stone Woman (2000; 3rd in the "Islam Quintet"). 
 Masters of the Universe: NATO's Balkan Crusade (2000). 
 Clash of Fundamentalisms: Crusades, Jihads and Modernity (2002). 
 Bush in Babylon (2003). 
 Street-Fighting Years: An Autobiography of the Sixties (2005). 
 Speaking of Empire and Resistance: Conversations with Tariq Ali (2005). 
 Rough Music: Blair, Bombs, Baghdad, London, Terror (2005). 
 Conversations with Edward Said (2005). 
 A Sultan in Palermo (2005; featuring Muhammad al-Idrisi and Roger II of Sicily; 4th in the "Islam Quintet"). 
 The Leopard and the Fox (2006). 
 Pirates of the Caribbean: Axis of Hope (2006) ; revised edn. (2008). 
 A Banker for All Seasons: Bank of Crooks and Cheats Incorporated (2007). 
 The assassination: Who Killed Indira G? (2008). 
 The Duel: Pakistan on the Flight Path of American Power (2008). 
 The Protocols of the Elders of Sodom: and other Essays (2009). 
 The Idea of Communism (non-fiction) (2009). 
 Night of the Golden Butterfly (2010; 5th in the "Islam Quintet"). 
 The Obama Syndrome: Surrender at Home, War Abroad (2010). 
 On History: Tariq Ali and Oliver Stone in Conversation. (2011), 
 Kashmir: The Case for Freedom (2011). 
 The Extreme Centre: A Warning (2015). 
 Permanent Counter Revolution (2016). 
 The Dilemmas of Lenin: Terrorism, War, Empire, Love, Revolution (2017). 
 The forty year war in Afghanistan : a chronicle foretold 2021 
 Winston Churchill: His Times, His Crimes (2022).

See also
 List of British Pakistanis

References

External links

 Tariq Ali Official webpage 
 
 Tariq Ali at the international literature festival berlin

1943 births
20th-century atheists
20th-century English male writers
20th-century English novelists
20th-century essayists
20th-century English historians
20th-century  British journalists
20th-century Pakistani male writers
21st-century atheists
21st-century English male writers
21st-century English novelists
21st-century essayists
21st-century English historians
21st-century  British journalists
Alumni of Exeter College, Oxford
English anti–nuclear weapons activists
Anti–Vietnam War activists
Atheist philosophers
English historical novelists
British male essayists
English male non-fiction writers
British Marxist journalists
English Marxists
English military historians
British secularists
English Trotskyists
British writers of Pakistani descent
20th-century English philosophers
Critics of neoconservatism
Critics of postmodernism
Critics of religions
Critics of the Catholic Church
English anti-war activists
English atheists
English essayists
English philosophers
English social commentators
Free speech activists
Freethought writers
Hayat Khattar family
International Marxist Group members
Journalists from Lahore
Literacy and society theorists
Living people
London Review of Books people
Mass media theorists
Media critics
Naturalised citizens of the United Kingdom
Opinion journalists
Pakistani anti-war activists
Pakistani atheists
Pakistani emigrants to the United Kingdom
Pakistani essayists
Pakistani historical novelists
Pakistani filmmakers
Pakistani Marxists
Pakistani non-fiction writers
Pakistani philosophers
Pakistani Trotskyists
Philosophers of art
Philosophers of culture
Philosophers of economics
Philosophers of education
Philosophers of history
Philosophers of social science
Philosophers of war
Political philosophers
Presidents of the Oxford Union
Punjabi people
Social philosophers
Theorists on Western civilization
University of the Punjab alumni
Writers about activism and social change
Writers about globalization
Writers about religion and science
Writers from Lahore
Writers of historical fiction set in the Middle Ages
Writers of historical fiction set in the modern age
British republicans
Far-left politicians in the United Kingdom